The 2012–13 NBB Cup was the 45th season of the Dutch NBB Cup. The championship game was played on March 24, 2013 in the Topsportcentrum (Almere). EiffelTowers Den Bosch won the game 73–61 over Landstede Basketbal and the club won its sixth NBB Cup title.

Bracket
The bracket includes games beginning with the 4th round, when professional teams from the DBL play their first games. In the quarterfinals and semifinals, the teams played two games.

Final

References

NBB Cup
NBB Cup